Sociological Perspectives is the official publication of the Pacific Sociological Association. It is a peer-reviewed academic journal published in six issues each year by SAGE. It was first published in 1957 as The Pacific Sociological Review, with John M. Foskett as founding editor. Since 1983 it is known under its current name.

As of 2022, the editors are Black Hawk Hancock and Bryan L. Sykes. Articles typically address social processes and are related to economic, political, social, and historical issues.

Abstracting and indexing 
Sociological Perspectives is abstracted and indexed in the Social Sciences Citation Index. According to the Journal Citation Reports, the journal has a 2021 impact factor of 1.771, ranking it 80th out of 149 journals in the category "Sociology", and a 5 year impact factor of 2.384.

References

External links
 Official website
 Pacific Sociological Association Official website

Sociology journals
University of California Press academic journals
Publications established in 1957
Quarterly journals
English-language journals